Chumash (also Ḥumash; ,  or  or Yiddish: ; plural Ḥumashim) is a Torah in printed and book bound form (i.e. codex) as opposed to a Sefer Torah, which is a scroll. 'The word comes from the Hebrew word for five, . It is also known by the Latinised Greek term Pentateuch in common printed editions.

Etymology

 
The Modern Hebrew and Sephardic pronunciation  is an erroneous reconstruction based on the assumption that the Ashkenazic accent, which is almost uniformly penultimately stressed, had also changed the stress of the word. In fact,  preserves the original stress pattern and both pronunciations contain a shifted first vowel.

In early scribal practice, there was a distinction between a Sefer Torah, containing the entire Pentateuch on a parchment scroll, and a copy of one of the five books on its own, which was generally bound in codex form, like a modern book, and had a lesser degree of sanctity. The term  strictly applies to one of the latter. Compare the misunderstanding of "Tur" to mean the entirety of the Arba'ah Turim.

In the legal codes, such as Maimonides' Mishneh Torah, it is laid down that any copy of the Pentateuch which does not comply with the strict rules for a Sefer Torah, for example, because it is not a parchment scroll or contains vowel signs, has only the same sanctity as a copy of an individual book. In this way, the word  (or ) came to have the extended sense of any copy of the Pentateuch other than a Sefer Torah.

Usage
The word ḥumash generally only refers to "book" bound editions of the Pentateuch, whereas the "scroll" form is called a sefer Torah ("book [of the] Torah").

In modern Jewish practice: 
 A printed ḥumash usually sets out the Hebrew text of the Torah with niqqud (vowel marks) and cantillation marks, separated into its 54 constituent weekly Torah portions (parashiyyot), together with the haftarah for each portion and, often, translations and notes.
 A ḥumash-Rashi also contains the Targum Onkelos and the commentary of Rashi, and may or may not have a vernacular translation of the text.
 A Tikkun soferim or Tiqqun Qore'im sets out, in parallel columns, the unvocalized text of the Pentateuch as it would appear in a Torah scroll and the normal printed text as it appears in a Chumash; it sometimes includes haftarot and the Five Megillot. It exists as an aid for soferim (Torah scribes) and for those preparing to read from the sefer Torah in the synagogue.
 A multi-volume set in Hebrew only, often but not always including the entire Tanakh  with masoretic notes (sometimes), Targumim and several classical commentaries, is referred to as Mikraot Gedolot ("Great Scriptures").

Various publications

 The Pentateuch and Haftorahs, London 1937, known as the "Hertz Chumash", containing the commentary of former British Chief Rabbi Joseph Hertz
 Soncino Chumash, (1st of the 14 volume Soncino Books of the Bible series) ed. Abraham Cohen, containing notes summarizing the traditional commentaries (Mikraot Gedolot).
 Torah and Haftarot, translation by Philip Birnbaum (Hebrew Publishing Company, 1983. )
 Etz Hayim Humash (Published by the Jewish Publication Society of America ): associated with Conservative movement
 Gutnik Chumash with Onkelos, Rashi and commentaries of the Lubavitcher Rebbe
 The Torah: A Modern Commentary, Revised Edition.  W. Gunther Plaut, ed.  New York: Union for Reform Judaism, 2006: associated with American Reform movement
 The Torah: A Women's Commentary'', edited by Tamara Cohn Eskenazi and Andrea L. Weiss, Union for Reform Judaism/Women of Reform Judaism, 2008

References

External links
 Judaism 101: Chumash

 
Sifrei Kodesh